Somchai Limpichat (born 10 December 1940) is a Thai former swimmer. He competed in the men's 100 metre freestyle at the 1964 Summer Olympics.

References

1940 births
Living people
Somchai Limpichat
Somchai Limpichat
Swimmers at the 1964 Summer Olympics
Place of birth missing (living people)
Asian Games medalists in swimming
Somchai Limpichat
Swimmers at the 1966 Asian Games
Medalists at the 1966 Asian Games
Somchai Limpichat